Jasmine Becket-Griffith (born June 4, 1979) is a freelance artist who specializes in fairy, fantasy, and gothic artwork. Her preferred medium is acrylic on canvas or wood and her designs appear on many lines of licensed merchandise, notably through the chain stores Hot Topic and collectibles through the Bradford Group including co-branded Disney projects.  She is also a staple at fantasy conventions, namely Dragon*Con, MegaCon (Orlando) and FaerieCon.

Since 2006, Jasmine began doing freelance co-branded artwork with the Walt Disney Company as an independent contractor.

Jasmine's physical gallery for her artwork is at Pop Gallery Orlando at Disney Springs in the Walt Disney World Resort.  Her licensed Disney character artwork can be found at Disneyland's WonderGround Gallery in Anaheim, California as well as Disney World's Disney Marketplace Co-Op.
She lives in Celebration, Florida with her husband/assistant, author Matthew David Becket, and also maintains a small studio in London, England.

Books

Her artwork has been published in:

 Fairy: the Art of Jasmine Becket-Griffith
 Jasmine Becket-Griffith: Portfolio Volume I
 The Art of Faery by David Riche
 The World of Faery by David Riche
 Spectrum 11: The Best in Contemporary Fantastic Art
 Spectrum 13: The Best in Contemporary Fantastic Art
 Spectrum 15: The Best in Contemporary Fantastic Art
 Spectrum 17: The Best in Contemporary Fantastic Art
 Spectrum 18: The Best in Contemporary Fantastic Art
 Spectrum 19: The Best in Contemporary Fantastic Art
 Spectrum 20: The Best in Contemporary Fantastic Art
 500 Fairy Motifs by David Riche
 Gothic Art Now by Jasmine Becket-Griffith and Brom
 Vampire Art Now by Jasmine Becket-Griffith and Matthew David Becket
 Strangeling by Jasmine Becket-Griffith, Amber Logan and Kachina Mickeletto
 Lowbrow Cats by Rakel Velasco
 Beautiful Creatures Tarot by Jay R. Rivera and Jasmine Becket-Griffith

External links
 Strangeling.com(Her own website)

References

Fantasy artists
1979 births
Living people
American speculative fiction artists
British speculative fiction artists